NA-213 Mirpur Khas-II is a constituency for the National Assembly of Pakistan.

Members of Parliament

2018-2022: NA-219 Mirpur Khas-II

Election 2002 

General elections were held on 10 Oct 2002. Syed Qurban Ali Shah of PPP won by 56,627 votes.

Election 2008 

General elections were held on 18 Feb 2008. Mir Munawar Ali Talpur of PPP won by 82,697 votes.

Election 2013 

General elections were held on 11 May 2013. Mir Munawar Ali Talpur of PPP won by 113,218 votes and became the  member of National Assembly.

Election 2013 

General elections were held on 11 May 2013. Pir Shafqat Hussain Shah Jilani of PPP won by 82,017 votes and became the  member of National Assembly.

Election 2018 

General elections were held on 25 July 2018.

See also
NA-212 Mirpur Khas-I
NA-214 Umerkot

References

External links 
Election result's official website

NA-227